Noah Ernest Dorsey (March 15, 1873 – 1959) was an American physicist, known for his contributions to measurement technology.

He was born in Annapolis, Maryland and studied at Johns Hopkins University where he obtained a B.A. (1893) and a Ph.D. (1897).  He worked at the same place a few years, was with U. S. Bureau of Soils and the Department of Agriculture as well, before he eventually joined National Bureau of Standards (1903) where he stayed until retirement in 1943. His research was on standards of radioactivity and x-ray measurements (1914–22), becoming the leader of the Radium Section (1921) and publishing a widely used book covering this emerging field, including specifications of his own bodily injuries from interactions with radium and radon.

Books
The Physics of Radioactivity (1921)

References

American physicists
People from Annapolis, Maryland
Johns Hopkins University alumni
Johns Hopkins University faculty
1873 births
1959 deaths
Date of death missing
Place of death missing